Pleurobranchus mamillatus is a species of sidegill slug, a marine gastropod mollusc in the family Pleurobranchidae.

References 

 SeaSlug Forum info on this species
 NudiPixel images of this species

External links

Pleurobranchidae
Gastropods described in 1832